Max Ring (August 4, 1817 in Zauditz - March 28, 1901 in Berlin) was a German physician, novelist, poet, and dramatist.

Biography 
Max Ring was the son of a farmer in the Silesian town of Zauditz (now Sudice) near Ratibor (now Racibórz).

He attended the Jewish community school in Gleiwitz and showed literary talents, writing his first poem at the age of 8. He began studying medicine at the University of Breslau in 1836. To complete his medical studies, in 1838 he travelled to Berlin with his childhood friend Ludwig Traube. It was there where he met young intellectuals such as Moritz Carrière, Karl Grün and Heinrich Bernhard Oppenheim and made his debut as an author in 1839 with a volume of poems that he edited together with his friend Moritz Fränkel.

Graduating as in 1840, he began practicing medicine at Gleiwitz where he experienced the hardship and social conflicts in the countryside. He worked as a physician during the outbreak of the typhus epidemic in Upper Silesia and described the suffering he witnessed in a socially critical paper on the causes and course of the epidemic. This text underwent censorship. During the revolution in 1848, Ring took part in the political movement as a staunch democrat and was attacked with an anti-Semitic pamphlet by his opposition.

In 1849, Ring published his first novel, Berlin and Breslau, about the revolution. In 1850 he moved to Berlin, where he quickly made contact with literary circles. He befriended Theodor Mundt, Karl Gutzkow, and Theodor Mügge, and became a close family friend and doctor of Karl August Varnhagen von Ense. In 1856 he married Elvira Heymann, daughter of the publisher Karl Heymann, and in 1862 discontinued his medical practise in order to devote himself to literature exclusively. He seldom left Berlin and made only a few long trips to Austria, Switzerland and Northern Italy. In 1890 the King of Prussia awarded him the title of honorary professor.

Ring achieved his first success as a dramatist in the comedy "Unsere Freunde," and his second, in the drama "Ein Deutsches Königshaus." He became a very active contributor to Die Gartenlaube and, from 1863 to 1865 when the publication was prohibited in Prussia, he created a similar, spin-off publication in Berlin under the title Der Volksgarten.

Heinrich von Kleist's grave inscription 
Heinrich von Kleist was a German poet, who died with his lover Henriette Vogel in a suicide pact. Because of the nature of their deaths, Kleist and Vogel were denied church burial and were instead interred where they died and the gravesite fell into disrepair for most of the nineteenth century. It was freshened up when Kleist became admired by late-century nationalists and was commemorated with a large stonehead for the 1936 Olympic Games. A poem of Ring's was inscribed on tomb. In 1941, Georg Minde-Pouet, a Nazi Kleist scholar and librarian, informed Germany’s Propaganda Minister Joseph Goebbels that the quatrain on the tomb was written by a Jew, and Ring’s words were removed.

Works 

 Gedichte. Leipzig, 1839 (with Moritz Fränkel)
 De Typho Abdominali, Berlin 1840 (Diss.; Digitalisat)
 Revolution. Breslau, 1848. (Gedicht)
 Berlin und Breslau. 1847–1849. Roman. 2 Bde., Breslau, 1849
 Die Genfer. Trauerspiel in 5 Akten. Breslau, 1850
 Die Kinder Gottes. Roman. 3 Bde. Breslau, 1851
 Der große Kurfürst und der Schöppenmeister. Historischer Roman aus Preußens Vergangenheit. 3 Bde. Breslau, 1852
 Stadtgeschichten. 4 Bde. Berlin, 1852
 Aus dem Tagebuches eines Berliner Arztes. Berlin, 1856
 Hinter den Coulissen. Humoristische Skizzen aus der Theaterwelt. Berlin, 1857
 John Milton und seine Zeit. Historischer Roman. Frankfurt a. M., 1857
 Rosenkreuzer und Illuminaten. Historischer Roman aus dem 18. Jahrhundert. 4 Bde. Berlin, 1861
 Vaterländische Geschichten. 2 Bde Berlin, 1862
 Neue Stadtgeschichten. 2 Bde. Berlin, 1865
 Ein verlorenes Geschlecht. 6 Bde. Berlin, 1867
 Lorbeer und Cypresse. Literaturbilder. Berlin, 1869 (Darin u. a. über Johann Christian Günther, Moses Mendelssohn, Heinrich von Kleist, Friedrich Hölderlin)
 Götzen und Götter. Roman. 4 Bde. Berlin, 1870
 In der Schweiz. Reisebilder und Novellen. 2 Bde. Leipzig, 1870
 Die Weltgeschichte ist das Weltgericht. Louis Napoleon Bonaparte. Berlin, 1870
 Carl Sand und seine Freunde. Roman aus der Zeit der alten Burschenschaft. 4 Bde. Berlin, 1873
 David Kalisch, der Vater des Kladderadatsch und Begründer der Berliner Lokalposse. Berlin, 1873
 Der Kleinstädter in Berlin. 2 Bde. Berlin, 1873
 Unfehlbar. Zeitroman. 4 Bde. Jena, 1874
 Der große Krach. Roman. 4 Bde. Jena, 1875
 Neue Stadtgeschichten. 3 Bde. Leipzig, 1876
 Das Haus Hillel. Historischer Roman aus der Zeit der Zerstörung Jerusalems. 3 Bde. Berlin, 1879
 Die Frauenverschwörung, zweiaktige Operette, Musik von Gustav Hinrichs, unter Hernahme des Stoffs des Lustspiels von Arthur Müller Die Verschwörung der Frauen oder Die Preußen in Berlin von 1858, 1886
 Berliner Leben. Kulturstudien und Sittenbilder. Leipzig, 1882
 Berliner Kinder. Roman. 3 Bde. Berlin, 1883
 Die deutsche Kaiserstadt Berlin und ihre Umgebung. 2 Bde. Leipzig, 1883–1884
 Die Spiritisten. Erzählung. Berlin, 1885
 Erinnerungen. 2 Bde. Berlin, 1898

References 

German Jews
1817 births
1901 deaths
University of Breslau alumni
19th-century German dramatists and playwrights
19th-century German novelists
19th-century German poets
German physicians